The Rapid Fire Arena is a skating facility located in Moriches, New York.  It is the home of the Suffolk Sting  of the Professional Inline Hockey Association Pro Division (PIHA Pro) and the Professional Inline Hockey Association Minor League (PIHAML).

References

External links
 Rapid Fire Arena official site 

Brookhaven, New York
Sports venues in Suffolk County, New York